Marc Bryan-Brown is a photographer based in Manhattan, New York City, United States.

Bryan-Brown was educated in England at the Dragon School in Oxford and Marlborough College in Wiltshire. He then attended the Rochester Institute of Technology in the USA.

Bryan-Brown has photographed entertainers. He has also undertaken photography for Broadway theatre productions. His work has appeared in The Huffington Post and The Daily Beast. He has been an official photographer at the Emmy Awards.

Bryan-Brown married Florence Ranney Seery in 1990. He is the younger brother of the theatrical press agent Adrian Bryan-Brown of Boneau/Bryan-Brown.

Collections
Bryan-Brown's work is held in the following public collection:
National Portrait Gallery, London: 3 prints of Paul Tanqueray

References

External links
 
 

Year of birth missing (living people)
Living people
People educated at The Dragon School
People educated at Marlborough College
Rochester Institute of Technology alumni
British expatriates in the United States
American photographers
People from Manhattan